Shen Yue (born February 27, 1997) is a Chinese actress, singer and model. She is known for her leading roles in the television series A Love So Beautiful (2017), Meteor Garden (2018), and Count Your Lucky Stars (2020).

Early life and education
Shen Yue was born in Wugang, Shaoyang City, Hunan Province, China. She studied Journalism and Communication at Hunan Normal University in 2014.  She was also an intern at Hunan Satellite TV. During her second year in college, her photographer friend posted a photo of her online, which attracted the attention of her future agent. She was then selected to participate in the reality show Summer Sweetie broadcast by Hunan Broadcasting System and later became an intern in Happy Camp.

Career
Beginnings
Shen Yue made her acting debut in the Chinese television series Autumn Harvest Uprising  in 2017, and proceeded to play a supporting role in the science fiction comedy television series Let's Shake It. The same year, she was cast as the female lead in the campus romance drama A Love So Beautiful.

2017–present: Rising popularity
Shen Yue rose to fame with her role as Chen Xiaoxi in the 2017 campus romance drama A Love So Beautiful alongside actor Hu Yitian, based on the novel To Our Pure Little Beauty by Zhao Gangan, which aired on Tencent Video on 9 November 2017.

In 2018, she portrayed the female lead Dong Shancai in the 2018 television series Meteor Garden,  based on the Japanese shōjo manga series  written by Yoko Kamio. It was a remake of the 2001 Taiwanese adaptation, also called Meteor Garden. The series was a hit in the Southeast-Asian region, and led to increased popularity for Shen Yue overseas.
Later on, she became a guest on a variety show with music performance called "Phanta City" with her Meteor Garden costars, Dylan Wang, Darren Chen, Connor Leong and Caesar Wu. She then became a cast member of the Chinese variety show The Inn 2 with her Meteor Garden co-star Dylan Wang.

In 2019, she performed in the annual CCTV Spring Festival Gala, presenting the sketch "Office's Story (办公室的故事)" alongside other veteran artists. The same year Shen Yue starred in Another Me, a television drama based on the film Soul Mate (2016) alongside Chen Duling.

In 2020, Shen Yue starred in the romance comedy drama Count Your Lucky Stars alongside Jerry Yan.

In 2021, Shen Yue starred alongside Jasper Liu in the romantic comedy drama Use For My Talent, which is a remake of the Korean drama, Clean with Passion for Now. She made her big screen debut in The Yinyang Master which was released in February 2021. On August, Shen Yue starred in the youth comedy drama, Be Yourself where she played a stubborn "tomboy".

In 2022, Shen Yue starred in the romantic fantasy comedy drama Mr. Bad'', opposite Zheyuan Chen and directed by Ching-Jung Lee.

Filmography

Film

Television series

Variety show

Discography

Awards and nominations

References

External links
 
 
 

21st-century Chinese actresses
Actresses from Hunan
Living people
Chinese television actresses
Hunan Normal University alumni
1997 births